Frances Anne Rafferty (June 16, 1922 – April 18, 2004) was an American actress, dancer, World War II pin-up girl and Metro-Goldwyn-Mayer contract player.

Early life
Frances Anne Rafferty was born in Sioux City, Iowa, the daughter of Maxwell Lewis Rafferty and DeEtta Frances ( Cox) Rafferty. She was the younger sister of California conservative educator and Republican politician Max Rafferty, whose wife was Frances ( Longman) Rafferty.

At the age of nine she moved with her family to Los Angeles, California.  At a young age she studied dancing, and her physical attributes and dancing skills led to work in the film industry.

Rafferty attended Miss Bryant's Day School and Bryant School while the family lived in Iowa. After moving to California, she graduated from University High School in Los Angeles.

Career
Signed by MGM Studios, Rafferty made her film debut in 1942.  She appeared in minor and secondary roles, and although she had a part in the 1944 film Dragon Seed with Katharine Hepburn and Walter Huston, her significant parts were limited almost exclusively to "B"  movies. For instance, in 1948, she starred with Hugh Beaumont in the film noir  Money Madness, directed by Sam Newfield. Her only 'major film' role was in Bud Abbott and Lou Costello in Hollywood (1945).

During World War II she was a volunteer pin-up girl for YANK magazine, a publication for the soldiers of the United States military.

In 1949, Rafferty was a performer on the anthology series Oboler Comedy Theater on ABC television.

From 1954 to 1959, she appeared as Ruth Ruskin Henshaw in all 156 episodes of the Desilu Studios CBS sitcom December Bride.  When Harry Morgan and Cara Williams joined in another CBS sitcom, Pete and Gladys in 1960, Rafferty was subsequently cast in seven episodes in the role of "Nancy".

Rafferty appeared in a number of different television programs throughout the 1950s and 1960s. Among them were two guest appearances on Perry Mason. She portrayed Heather Marlow in “Never Look Back”, the Season 4, Episode 18, installment of My Three Sons in 1964.
 
After her retirement from acting in 1965, she made a final appearance in a 1977 episode of Karl Malden's ABC crime drama, The Streets of San Francisco.

Personal life
She was married to her first husband from 1944 until their divorce in 1947. (Rafferty's biography on the Des Moines Register's DataCentral site gives Rafferty's first husband's name as "Maj. John Horton". An Associated Press news story dated February 18, 1947, reported, "Movie Actress Frances Rafferty obtained a divorce today from John E. Horton, former army major.")

In 1948, she married Thomas R. Baker, and together they had two children. Following her retirement from acting, Rafferty and her husband operated a ranch where they bred and raised quarter horses.

Death
Frances Rafferty died in 2004 in Paso Robles, California.

Filmography

References

External links

American film actresses
American television actresses
Ranchers from California
1922 births
2004 deaths
Actresses from Los Angeles
Actors from Sioux City, Iowa
Metro-Goldwyn-Mayer contract players
20th-century American actresses
21st-century American women